The 1980 Boston College Eagles football team represented Boston College as an independent during the 1980 NCAA Division I-A football season. In its third and final season under head coach Ed Chlebek, the team compiled a 7–4 record and outscored opponents by a combined total of 199 to 186.

The team's statistical leaders included John Loughery with 1,519 passing yards, Shelby Gamble with 702 rushing yards, and Rob Rikard with 460 receiving yards. 

The team played its home games at Alumni Stadium in Chestnut Hill, Massachusetts.

Schedule

Roster

References

Boston College
Boston College Eagles football seasons
Boston College Eagles football
Boston College Eagles football